Jan Fredrik "Freddy" Modin (born 8 October 1974) is a Swedish former professional ice hockey left winger who played 14 seasons in the National Hockey League (NHL) and most notably won the Stanley Cup with the Tampa Bay Lightning in the 2003–04 season.

Playing career 
Modin played his youth league games for the Njurunda Sports Club, like Henrik Zetterberg. In 2008, the club renamed their arena—until then known as Njurunda Ishall—to Modin & Zetterberg-hallen.

Modin was drafted 64th overall by the Toronto Maple Leafs in the 1994 NHL Entry Draft. He was traded to the Tampa Bay Lightning on October 1, 1999, where he served as an alternate captain for several seasons. In 2001, he was the lone Lightning player at the 51st NHL All-Star Game and won the "Hardest Shot" competition with a blast clocked at 102.1 mph. He went on to win the Stanley Cup with the Lightning in the 2003–04 season. For the 2004–05 season, Fredrik Modin returned to Sweden to play for Timrå IK due to the NHL lockout. He scored 12 goals, 24 assists and had a total of 36 points. On June 30, 2006, he was traded to the Columbus Blue Jackets (along with Fredrik Norrena) in exchange for Marc Denis.

Modin served as an alternate captain for the Blue Jackets. He has begun to decline in production, due to injuries. He scored a goal in Game 4 of the Blue Jackets' opening round playoff series against the Detroit Red Wings, the Blue Jackets' first-ever playoff appearance.

During the 2009–10 season, at the NHL trade deadline, Modin was traded by the Blue Jackets to the Los Angeles Kings for future considerations on March 3, 2010.

On September 6, 2010, Modin signed a one-year contract as a free agent with the Atlanta Thrashers. He posted 7 goals in 36 games for the Thrashers. On February 28, 2011, Modin was traded to the Calgary Flames for a seventh round pick in the 2011 NHL Entry Draft.

Hampered by a lingering back injury in his last two seasons, Modin announced his retirement on May 19, 2011.

Awards 
 Gold medal at the Ice Hockey World Championship in 1998.
 Played in the NHL All-Star Game in 2000-2001.
 Hardest Shot at NHL SuperSkills Competition in 2001 (102.1 mph).
 Bronze medal at the Ice Hockey World Championship in 2001.
 Stanley Cup winner with Tampa Bay Lightning in 2004.
 He is a member of the Triple Gold Club having won the 1998 World Championships, the 2004 Stanley Cup with Tampa Bay Lightning and Olympic Gold Medal in 2006.
 Most points in World Cup of Hockey 2004
 All-star team World Cup of Hockey 2004
 Gold medal at the Winter Olympics in 2006.

Career statistics

Regular season and playoffs

International

References

External links

1974 births
Living people
Atlanta Thrashers players
Brynäs IF players
Calgary Flames players
Columbus Blue Jackets
Columbus Blue Jackets players
Ice hockey players at the 2006 Winter Olympics
Ice hockey players at the 2010 Winter Olympics
Los Angeles Kings players
Medalists at the 2006 Winter Olympics
National Hockey League All-Stars
Olympic gold medalists for Sweden
Olympic ice hockey players of Sweden
Olympic medalists in ice hockey
People from Sundsvall
Stanley Cup champions
Swedish expatriate ice hockey players in Canada
Swedish expatriate ice hockey players in the United States
Swedish ice hockey left wingers
Tampa Bay Lightning players
Timrå IK players
Toronto Maple Leafs draft picks
Toronto Maple Leafs players
Triple Gold Club
Sportspeople from Västernorrland County